Wushu at the 2019 South Asian Games was contested at the Army Physical Fitness Centre, Lagankhel, in Lalitpur, Nepal, from 5 to 8 December 2019.

Medal table

Medalists

Men's taolu

Women's taolu

Men's sanda

Women's sanda

References

2019 South Asian Games
Events at the 2019 South Asian Games
Wushu at the South Asian Games